Nowruzabad (also Romanized as Nowrūzābād and Nowrūz Ābād) is a village in Tajan Rural District, in the Central District of Sarakhs County, Razavi Khorasan Province, Iran. At the 2006 census, its population was 235, in 50 families.

References 

Populated places in Sarakhs County